Daniel L. Burrows (January 23, 1908 – June 3, 1990) was an American politician from New York who was elected to the New York State Assembly between 1939 and 1944.

Burrows was born in Cape Charles, Virginia, on January 23, 1908, and raised in New York City from the age of three. He worked as a real estate and insurance broker, and was a cofounder of the United Mutual Life Insurance Company. Burrows became active in Tammany Hall. By 1938, Burrows had been appointed to the Democratic Party's state committee, as a representative of Manhattan. He was elected to the 19th district seat on the New York State Assembly, succeeding Robert W. Justice, serving from 1939 to 1944 in the 162nd, 163rd, and 164th New York State Legislatures. In October 1939, Burrows was elected to the executive committee of Tammany Hall.

Daniel L. Burrows was married to Elaine until her death in 1975. He died on June 3, 1990, aged 82, while seeking treatment for cancer at Calvary Hospital. The couple had two daughters, Gloria and Joyce. Joyce Dinkins, who married David Dinkins, the Mayor of New York City from 1990 to 1993, became the city's first African-American first lady. A Callery pear tree was planted at Gracie Mansion to memorialize Burrows.

References

1908 births
1990 deaths
Deaths from cancer in New York (state)
Politicians from Manhattan
African-American state legislators in New York (state)
Democratic Party members of the New York State Assembly
People from Northampton County, Virginia
American businesspeople in insurance
Insurance agents
American real estate businesspeople
Real estate brokers
American company founders
African-American company founders
20th-century American businesspeople
20th-century American politicians
People from Harlem
20th-century African-American politicians
African-American men in politics